Morris Raphael Cohen (July 25, 1880 – January 28, 1947) was an American judicial philosopher, lawyer, and legal scholar who united pragmatism with logical positivism and linguistic analysis. This union coalesced into the "objective relativism" fermenting at Columbia University before and during the early twentieth-century interwar period. He was father to Felix S. Cohen and Leonora Cohen Rosenfield.

Life and career
Cohen was born in Minsk, Imperial Russia (present-day Belarus), the son of Bessie (Farfel) and Abraham Mordecai Cohen. He moved with his family to New York, at the age of 12. He attended the City College of New York and Harvard University, where he studied under Josiah Royce, William James, and Hugo Münsterberg. He obtained a PhD from Harvard in 1906.

He was Professor of Philosophy at CCNY from 1912 to 1938. He also taught law at City College and the University of Chicago 1938-41, gave courses at the New School for Social Research, and lectured in Philosophy and Law at Columbia, Cornell, Harvard, Stanford, Yale, and other universities.

Cohen was legendary as a professor for his wit, encyclopedic knowledge, and ability to demolish philosophical systems. "He could and did tear things apart in the most devastating and entertaining way; but...he had a positive message of his own", said Robert Hutchins. Bertrand Russell said of Cohen that he had the most original mind in contemporary American philosophy.

In the 1930s, Cohen helped give CCNY its reputation as the "proletarian Harvard," perhaps more than any other faculty member. He advocated liberalism in politics but opposed laissez-faire economics. Cohen also defended liberal democracy and wrote indictments of both fascism and communism. Cohen's obituary in the New York Times called him "an almost legendary figure in American philosophy, education and the liberal tradition".

From his work, Reason and Nature:
To be sure, the vast majority of people who are untrained can accept the results of science only on authority. But there is obviously an important difference between an establishment that is open and invites every one to come, study its methods, and suggest improvement, and one that regards the questioning of credentials as due to wickedness of heart, such as Cardinal Newman attributed to those who questioned the infallibility of the Bible. . . . Rational science treats its credit notes as always redeemable on demand, while non-rational authoritarianism regards the demand for the redemption of its paper as a disloyal lack of faith.

On May 3, 1953, under President Buell G. Gallagher, the City College Library was dedicated to and named for Morris Raphael Cohen.

Cohen helped, with Professor Salo W. Baron, organize the Conference on Jewish Relations to study modern Jewry scientifically; he also edited its quarterly journal Jewish Social Studies.

Main works 
 Reason and Nature (1931, rev. 1953), his major philosophical work.
 Law and the Social Order (1933)
 An Introduction to Logic and the Scientific Method, with Ernest Nagel (1934)
 The Faith of a Liberal (1945)
 A Preface to Logic (1945)
 The Meaning of Human History (1947)

Published posthumously
 A Dreamer's Journey (1949), his autobiography.
 Reason and Law (1950)
 American Thought, a Critical Sketch (1954)

References

External links 

Morris Raphael Cohen - Encyclopedia.com page hosting several entries on Cohen from published reference works.
"Who Was Morris Raphael Cohen?" by Leonora Davidson Cohen Rosenfield
 "Morris Raphael Cohen: The Golden Age of Philosophy at CCNY 1906-1938 - City College of New York Libraries
 
 
"Professor Morris Raphael Cohen, Noted Philosopher and Author, Dies at 66" obituary from the Jewish Telegraphic Agency
"The Philosophy of Morris R. Cohen" by Sidney Hook in The New Republic (originally published 23 July 1930) 
."Morris R. Cohen in Retrospect" [$] (1957) by Ernest Nagel, Journal of the History of Ideas, 18(4), 548-551. doi:10.2307/2707565 [available to read online free, as one of six articles per month, with registration at JSTOR] 
 Guide to the Morris Raphael Cohen Papers 1898-1981 at the University of Chicago Special Collections Research Center 

1880 births
1947 deaths
Cornell University faculty
City College of New York alumni
City College of New York faculty
Jewish philosophers
Jewish American writers
Harvard University alumni
Harvard University faculty
Belarusian Jews
Emigrants from the Russian Empire to the United States